The Professional Roughstock Series (PRS) was an American rodeo organization based in Belle Fourche, South Dakota, United States. It featured American rodeo's three roughstock events: bareback bronc riding, saddle bronc riding and bull riding.

History
The organization was founded in 2001. Though in its first several years it was composed of a few annual stand-alone events, it was eventually formed into a formal sporting league. 12 bareback bronc riders, 12 bull riders, and 12 saddle bronc riders were included in each event. They each paid an entry fee to compete. All competitors competed in the first round. The top four riders in each category then moved on to the championship round to determine the event champions with the two highest scores.

When the regular season ended, the top 12 riders in each event based on points would qualify for the PRS World Finals. The top riders based on overall points for the year were crowned the PRS World Champions. The first world finals event took place in 2012 in Salina, Kansas. The second world finals took place in Rapid City, South Dakota. The third world finals also took place in Rapid City, only this time in conjunction with the Professional Rodeo Cowboys Association (PRCA) sanctioned Black Hills Stock Show & Rodeo. The 2015 PRS regular season ended two-thirds of the way in without its planned world finals event, which was scheduled to take place in Amarillo, Texas.

In October 2015, the Professional Roughstock Series announced on its website that it was suspending operations. It was due to the loss of financial backing and the inexperience of leadership that was its ultimate demise.

From 2013 to 2015, PRS events were televised on RFD-TV.

PRS World Champions

Bareback Riders
2014  Brian Bain
2013  Justin McDaniel 
2012  Steven Peebles

Bull Riders
2014  Dave Samsel
2013  McKennon Wimberly
2012  Seth Glause

Saddle Bronc Riders
2014  J.J. Elshere
2013  Cort Scheer
2012  Jesse Wright

External links
 Professional Roughstock Series
 Professional Rodeo Cowboys Association

Rodeo organizations
Rodeo in the United States
Rodeo competition series
Organizations based in South Dakota
Sports competitions in South Dakota
Organizations established in 2001
2000s establishments in South Dakota